Benedict To Varpin (24 July 1936 – 8 September 2020) was a Papua New Guinean Roman Catholic archbishop.

To Varpin was born in Papua New Guinea and was ordained to the priesthood in 1971. He served as bishop of the Roman Catholic Diocese of Bereina, Papua New Guinea from 1979 to 1987. To Varpin served as coadjutor archbishop of the Roman Catholic Archdiocese of Madang, Papua New Guinea in 1987 and then archbishop of the archdiocese from 1987 to 2001.

To Varpin died in Rabaul on 8 September 2020.

Notes

1936 births
2020 deaths
20th-century Roman Catholic archbishops in Papua New Guinea
People from East New Britain Province
Roman Catholic archbishops of Madang
Papua New Guinean Roman Catholic archbishops
Roman Catholic bishops of Bereina